Kveldúlfur was an Icelandic trawler company that was established in 1912 by Thor Jensen.

Kveldúlfur was one of the largest fishing companies in Iceland until the Second World War, running 7 boats at peak. It made Jensen one of the wealthiest men in Iceland. The company operated from Reykjavík. In 1929 it caught 23,791,000 kilos of fish. After World War II the company declined and eventually operated with just one trawler

Kveldúlfur closed in 1977.

References

Shipping companies of Iceland
Food and drink companies established in 1912
1912 establishments in Iceland
1977 disestablishments in Iceland
Food and drink companies disestablished in 1977
Thors family